Stephen George Barchet (April 4, 1901 – November 30, 1964) was an American football player and a rear admiral in the United States Navy.  

Barchet was born in St. Margaret's, Maryland, in 1901. He attended the United States Naval Academy where he played baseball and football at the Naval Academy. He played as a halfback for the Navy Midshipmen football team and was selected by Walter Camp as a third-team All-American in both 1921 and 1922 and won the Thompson Trophy in 1922. 

After graduating from the Naval Academy, Barchet served in the United States Navy for 30 years from 1924 to 1954, attaining the rank of rear admiral. He commanded , which was near Midway Island, when the attack on Pearl Harbor occurred. He later commanded a submarine division base in Panama and served as operations officer for the Atlantic submarine force. In 1945, he received the Legion of Merit for his contributions to the development of the Atlantic and Pacific submarine fleets.

He retired from the Navy in 1954. He later worked for the American Trading and Production Company and as the head of a paper company in Alabama. He died in 1964 at age 63 at the naval hospital in Annapolis, Maryland. He was buried at the United States Naval Academy Cemetery in Annapolis, Maryland with his wife Louise Elizabeth Lankford.

References

1901 births
1964 deaths
American football halfbacks
Navy Midshipmen football players
Recipients of the Legion of Merit
United States Navy rear admirals (lower half)
Sportspeople from Annapolis, Maryland
Burials at the United States Naval Academy Cemetery